Ebrahimabad (also Romanized as Ebrāhīmābād) is a village in Azizabad Rural District, in the Central District of Narmashir County, Kerman Province, Iran. At the 2006 census, its population was 968, in 227 families.

References 

Populated places in Narmashir County